Evesham is a hamlet in Eye Hill Rural Municipality No. 382, Saskatchewan, Canada. In 2001, the community had a population of 40 people and today fosters 35 citizens. It previously held the status of village until August 3, 2000.

History
Prior to August 3, 2000, Evesham was incorporated as a village; it was restructured as a hamlet under the jurisdiction of the rural municipality of Eye Hill on that date.

See also
List of communities in Saskatchewan
Hamlets of Saskatchewan

References

Eye Hill No. 382, Saskatchewan
Former villages in Saskatchewan
Unincorporated communities in Saskatchewan
Populated places disestablished in 2000
Division No. 13, Saskatchewan